Henry Pollack may refer to:

 Henry Pollack (broadcaster) (born 1961), Cuban-born American radio broadcaster
 Henry Pollack (geophysicist), professor of geophysics at the University of Michigan

See also
 Henry Pollak (disambiguation)